The year 1931 was marked, in science fiction, by the following events.

Births and deaths

Births 
 January 9 : Algis Budrys, American writer, (d. 2008)
 January 28 : Sakyo Komatsu, Japan writer, (d. 2011)
 December 3 : Bob Shaw, British writer, (d. 1996)

Deaths

Events

Literary releases

Novels 
  Druso oder : die gestohlene Menschheit, by  Friedrich Freksa.

Stories collections

Short stories

Comics

Audiovisual outputs

Movies 
 Frankenstein, by James Whale.
 End of the World, by Abel Gance.
 A Connecticut Yankee, by David Butler.

Awards 
The main science-fiction Awards known at the present time did not exist at this time.

See also 
 1931 in science
 1930 in science fiction
 1932 in science fiction

References

Science fiction by year

science-fiction